Sheykh Ali Bast (also Romanized as Sheykh ‘Alī Bast, Shaikh-Ali-Bast, and Sheikh Ali Bast) is a village in Eslamabad Rural District, Sangar District, Rasht County, Gilan Province, Iran. At the 2006 census, its population was 696, in 221 families.

References 

Populated places in Rasht County